Incident in an Alley is a 1962 American neo noir crime film directed by Edward L. Cahn and starring Chris Warfield, Erin O'Donnell and Harp McGuire.

The film's premise rests on a legal precedent that police may use force against fleeing suspects if the suspect has committed a crime and is warned of the officer's intent to shoot. In 1985, the Supreme Court of the United States ruled in the case of Tennessee v. Garner that deadly force may be used to prevent the escape of a fleeing felon only if the officer has probable cause to believe that the suspect poses a serious risk to the officer or to others.

Plot
After beat cop Bill Joddy shoots and kills a fleeing suspect, the victim is found to be a 14-year-old boy. Joddy is charged with manslaughter but is acquitted by a jury. He begins to question his own culpability while trying to prove that the boy was participating in a robbery just before he was shot.

Cast
 Chris Warfield as Bill Joddy 
 Erin O'Donnell as Jean Joddy
 Harp McGuire as Frank
 Virginia Christine as Mrs. Connell
 Willis Bouchey as Police Capt. Tom Brady 
 Don Keefer as Roy Swanson
 Michael Vandever as Gussie Connell
 Gary Judis as Charlie
 Jim Canino as Mushie (as James Canino)
 Clancy Cooper as Police Sergeant

Production
The film was based on a television play written by Rod Serling that had aired in 1955 as part of the US Steel Hour starring Farley Granger. It was then announced as a film project by United Artists. Clarence Greene and Russell Rouse were assigned to produce, with Serling adapting the screenplay, but the film was not made until several years later.

Reception
In a contemporary review for The New York Times, critic Howard Thompson wrote: "For all its devious, transparent moralizing about the shooting of a young boy by a policeman, 'Incident in an Alley' belongs in one. The synthetic, floridly hewn little melodrama that opened yesterday on the circuits is strictly pulp stuff, conventionally posing a background of juvenile delinquency and the business of adult 'responsibility.'"

See also
 List of American films of 1962

References

External links

1962 films
1960s English-language films
American black-and-white films
1962 crime drama films
Films based on television plays
Films directed by Edward L. Cahn
American crime drama films
Films produced by Edward Small
Films scored by Richard LaSalle
United Artists
1960s American films